Saindak Dam is located in the desert of Saindak/Reko Diq, about 50 km away from the Iran border, in Baluchistan, Pakistan.

See also
List of dams and reservoirs in Pakistan

Notes

Dams in Balochistan, Pakistan